Mount Emily is a mountain in the Blue Mountains of eastern Oregon in the United States. It is located in western Union County on the Wallowa-Whitman National Forest.

Mount Emily is visible from much of the Grande Ronde Valley. Its southern edge is a landmark in, and symbol of, the city of La Grande.

Mt. Emily was named after Emily Leasey, of the Leasey family who were among the first white settlers of the Grande Ronde Valley. The area hosts many opportunities for recreation, including mountain biking.

References

External links
 

Mountains of Oregon
La Grande, Oregon
Landforms of Union County, Oregon